is a Japanese manga series written and illustrated by Takashi Hashiguchi. The series was serialized in Shogakukan's CoroCoro Comic magazine between December 1997 and August 2000, and was translated into English and published in Singapore by Chuang Yi.

In 1998, the manga series was adapted into a 22-episode anime television series produced by Xebec, it ran from November 1998 to September 1999. The television series has been dubbed into English in Singapore by Odex and released in 2003.

A Game Boy video game adaptation has been published by Hudson Soft in Japan on September 18, 1998.

Plot
Shunichi Domoto is a 5th grade boy. He usually helps the sport teams in his school due to his talent in sports. One day his friend, Beso Kimura lost his Yoyo in a Yoyo duel against a bully boy, Benkei Musashimaru and ask Shunichi for help. Shunichi challenges Benkei to a Yoyo duel then defeats him. After that he was challenged by the exceptionally gifted Yoyoer, Seito Hojoin and get beaten because he ridiculed the Yoyo game. So, Shunichi enters Japan's Yoyo championship to get his revenge from his loss with Seito. Throughout this Championship, he learns new Yoyo Skills, meets new friends and powerful rivals.

Manga volume list

Anime

Cast
 : 
 : 
 : 
 : 
 : 
 : 
 : 
 : 
 :

Music

Opening themes
 "SOMEDAY LET'S GO TOGETHER" performed by rub-down (Episodes 1-14).
 "Loop & Loop" performed by Showtaro Morikubo (who also voiced the main character) (Episodes 15-22).

Ending theme
 "Future" performed by Chiaki Nakajima.

Soundtrack
A soundtrack album titled  has been released by Polystar in Japan on September 1, 1999.

Episode list

Release
The anime series has been released on VHS in 5 volumes by Bandai Visual.

Notes

References

External links
 

1998 anime television series debuts
1999 Japanese television series endings
Anime series based on manga
Children's manga
Odex
Shogakukan franchises
Shogakukan manga
Sports anime and manga
TV Tokyo original programming
Xebec (studio)
Yo-yos
Japanese children's television series
Comics based on toys
Television shows based on toys
Video games based on toys